Colin Ward (14 August 1924 – 11 February 2010) was a British anarchist writer and editor. He has been called "one of the greatest anarchist thinkers of the past half century, and a pioneering social historian."

Life

Ward was born in Wanstead, Essex, to Arnold and Ruby Ward. Arnold was a teacher and Ruby a clerical worker. His parents were active Labour Party supporters. Ward attended Ilford County High School, leaving school aged 15. After leaving school he worked as an assistant to a builder, then for West Ham Council, before working as a draughtsman at Sidney Caulfield's architectural practice.

In 1942, aged 18, Ward was conscripted into the army as a sapper, going on to work as a draughtsman in the Royal Engineers. Based in Glasgow during the war, Ward began attending Glasgow Anarchist Group events. As a soldier he subscribed to the anti-militarist anarchist newspaper War Commentary, and in 1945 Ward was called as a witness for the prosecution in the trial of the paper's editors, John Hewetson, Vernon Richards and Philip Sansom. Shortly after the trial he was transferred to Orkney.

After being demobbed in 1946 he returned to working for Sidney Caulfield and began contributing to Freedom Press. In 1947 he began editing the anarchist newspaper Freedom – successor to War Commentary. He remained an editor of Freedom until 1960. He was the founder and editor of the monthly anarchist journal Anarchy from 1961 to 1970.

Until 1961, Ward worked as an architect's assistant. In 1964 undertook teacher training at Garnett College where he met his future wife, Harriet Unwin, and he subsequently began teaching at Wandsworth Technical College.

In 1971, he became the Education Officer for the Town and Country Planning Association. He published widely on education, architecture and town planning. His most influential book was The Child in the City (1978), about children's street culture. From 1995 to 1996, Ward was Centennial Professor of Housing and Social Policy at the London School of Economics.

In 2001, Ward was made an Honorary Doctor of Philosophy at Anglia Ruskin University.

Thought

Anarchism 

Ward's philosophy aimed at removing authoritarian forms of social organisation and replacing them with self-managed, non-hierarchical forms. This is based upon the principle that, as Ward put it, "in small face-to-face groups, the bureaucratising and hierarchical tendencies inherent in organisations have least opportunity to develop".

Anarchism for Ward is "a description of a mode of human organization, rooted in the experience of everyday life, which operates side by side with, and in spite of, the dominant authoritarian trends of our society". In contrast to many anarchist philosophers and practitioners, Ward holds that "anarchism in all its guises is an assertion of human dignity and responsibility. It is not a programme for political change but an act of social self-determination".

Education 
Colin Ward in his main theoretical publication Anarchy in Action (1973) in a chapter called "Schools No Longer" "discusses the genealogy of education and schooling, in particular examining the writings of Everett Reimer and Ivan Illich, and the beliefs of anarchist educator Paul Goodman. Many of Colin’s writings in the 1970s, in particular Streetwork: The Exploding School (1973, with Anthony Fyson), focused on learning practices and spaces outside of the school building. In introducing Streetwork, Ward writes, "[this] is a book about ideas: ideas of the environment as the educational resource, ideas of the enquiring school, the school without walls...”. In the same year, Ward contributed to Education Without Schools (edited by Peter Buckman) discussing 'the role of the state'. He argued that "one significant role of the state in the national education systems of the world is to perpetuate social and economic injustice"".

In The Child in the City (1978), and later The Child in the Country (1988), Ward "examined the everyday spaces of young people’s lives and how they can negotiate and re-articulate the various environments they inhabit. In his earlier text, the more famous of the two, Colin Ward explores the creativity and uniqueness of children and how they cultivate 'the art of making the city work'. He argued that through play, appropriation and imagination, children can counter adult-based intentions and interpretations of the built environment. His later text, The Child in the Country, inspired a number of social scientists, notably geographer Chris Philo (1992), to call for more attention to be paid to young people as a 'hidden' and marginalised group in society."

Bibliography 
 Violence (1970)
 Work (1972)
 Anarchy in Action (1973)
 Streetwork: The Exploding School (with Anthony Fyson) (1973)
 Vandalism (ed.) (1973)
 Utopia (1974)
 Tenants Take Over (1974)
 British School Buildings: Designs and Appraisals 1964–74 (1976)
 Housing: An Anarchist Approach (1976)
 The Child in the City (1978)
 Art and the Built Environment (with Eileen Adams) (1982)
 Arcadia for All: The Legacy of a Makeshift Landscape (with Dennis Hardy) (1984)
 The Plotlanders (with Dennis Hardy) (1985)
 When We Build Again: Let's Have Housing that Works! (1985)
 Goodnight Campers! The History of the British Holiday Camp (with Dennis Hardy) (1986)
 Chartres: the Making of a Miracle (1986)
 A Decade of Anarchy (1961–1970) (ed.) (1987)
 The Child in the Country (1988)
 The Allotment: Its Landscape and Culture (with David Crouch) (1988)
 Welcome, Thinner City: Urban Survival in the 1990s (1989)
 Undermining the Central Line (with Ruth Rendell) (1989)
 Talking Houses: 10 Lectures (1990)
 Images of Childhood In Old Postcards (with Tim Ward) (1991)
 Influences: Voices of Creative Dissent (1991)
 Freedom to Go: After the Motor Age (1991)
 New Town, Home Town (1993)
 Talking Schools (1995)
 Social Policy: An Anarchist Response (1996)
 Talking to Architects (1996)
 Stamps: Designs For Anarchist Postage Stamps (illustrated by Clifford Harper) (1997)
 Havens and Springboards: The Foyer Movement in Context (1997)
 Reflected in Water: A Crisis of Social Responsibility (1997)
 Sociable Cities: The Legacy of Ebenezer Howard (with Peter Hall) (1998)
 Cotters and Squatters: Housing's Hidden History (2002)
 Talking Anarchy (with David Goodway) (2003)
 Anarchism: A Very Short Introduction (2004)
 Autonomy, Solidarity, Possibility: The Colin Ward Reader (edited by Damian F. White and Chris Wilbert) (2011)
 Talking Green (2012)

See also 
Anarchism in England

References

Further reading

External links 
Colin Ward archive at RevoltLib
Colin Ward, Anarchism as a Theory of Organization (1966)
Colin Ward, Harmony through Complexity (1973)
Daily Telegraph obituary, 29 March 2010
Guardian obituary, 22 February 2010
The Good Life of a Gentle Anarchist, Boyd Tonkin, The Independent, 19 February 2010
 Colin Ward, Pioneer of Mutualism
 Obituary at Outrospection.org 
Autonomy, Solidarity, Possibility: The Colin Ward Reader
Center for a Stateless Society on Ward
Ward and Five Leaves publishers
Ward and the Essex plotlanders, The Guardian, 7 March 2010
 Inveterate anarchist with a plan to put roofs over the rural poor, The Guardian, 10 July 2002
Colin Ward interview by David Goodway
A friendly market-anarchist view of Colin Ward, by an editor of Reason, 'the magazine of free minds and free markets'
Anarchy in the UK? It could be the best government we’ve had, Boyd Tonkin, The Independent, 03 April 2015
Personally Speaking: Colin Ward in Conversation with Roger Deakin (video interview)

1924 births
2010 deaths
People from Wanstead
British Army personnel of World War II
English anarchists
English newspaper editors
English male journalists
Anarchist theorists
Anarcho-communists
DIY culture
20th-century English non-fiction writers
21st-century English non-fiction writers
20th-century English male writers
21st-century English male writers
English political writers